Marvelise is a commune in the Doubs département in the Bourgogne-Franche-Comté region in eastern France.

Geography
On the east are the Hauts des Roches (502 m) and on the west the Chanois (516 m).

Population

See also
 Communes of the Doubs department

References

External links

 Marvelise on the intercommunal Web site of the department 

Communes of Doubs